Coleophora hystricella is a moth of the family Coleophoridae. It is found on the Canary Islands (Fuerteventura) and in Algeria, Tunisia and Turkey.

References

hystricella
Moths described in 1957
Moths of Africa
Moths of Asia